Muquim Ahmed (born 1 September 1954) is a Bangladeshi-born British entrepreneur. He is thought to be the first Brick Lane millionaire.

Biography
Ahmed arrived in East London in the early 1970s, aged 19, to study engineering with the intention of returning to join the family business in Bangladesh.

Having invested £2 million in a bakery and a ready meals factory in South West London, Ahmed, 55, is building a food manufacturing leg to his property and restaurant portfolio. Best known for his work in transforming the Brick Lane area of East London, later helped his father export goods from Britain and the Netherlands to Bangladesh. He diversified into property and was a millionaire at 26. He has a £30m property portfolio while his Café Naz chain of restaurants turns over about £3.5 million a year. His other interests include a travel agency.

Ahmed is also a fellow of The University of London.

See also
 British Bangladeshi
 Business of British Bangladeshis
 List of British Bangladeshis

References

External links
Saini, Angela. Brick Lane restaurants under threat. BBC London. 2 December 2007
Saini, Angela. Olympic boost for Brick Lane. BBC London. 27 December 2007
Blunkett issues new race plea. BBC News. 27 June 2001
Muquim Ahmed - British Bangladeshi Who’s Who 2008

1954 births
Living people
British Muslims
Bangladeshi emigrants to the United Kingdom
Naturalised citizens of the United Kingdom
British restaurateurs
Bangladeshi businesspeople
Businesspeople from London
People from Sylhet
People from Shadwell